is a Japanese composer who has contributed to the Bemani series of music video games. He has produced songs for Beatmania, Beatmania IIDX, Pop'n Music, Dance Maniax, Guitar Freaks, DrumMania, Mambo a Gogo, and Dance Dance Revolution (Dancing Stage). He collaborated with the Shibuya-Kei vocalist "EeL" to provide original songs for BEMANI under her "EeL" pseudonym. "Orange Lounge" is the pseudonym used for his Shibuya-Kei compositions, with lyrics sung and written by Shizue Tokui.  "Nick boys" is the pseudonym for his Hip hop-influenced collaboration with Des-ROW. "Zektbach" is the pseudonym used for his classical music influenced concept pieces by forms of fantasy worlds, usually with choirs and classical instrumentation.

BEMANI Works

beatmania
Feel the light, beatmania 6th Mix
What is love?,  beatmania 7th Mix
u gotta groove -FUTURE LATIN MIX-, beatmania CORE REMIX (remix of u gotta groove, originally made by dj nagureo)

Mambo a Gogo
Lover's high
La brise d'ete
Gamelan de couple
Sci-Fi Girl
Nova Emocao
One minute Kitchen Battle!

Dance ManiaX
Mobo★Moga, Dance ManiaX (under Orange Lounge)
Jane Jana, Dance ManiaX
All my love, Dance ManiaX
Mind Parasite, Dance ManiaX 2nd Mix
STAY (Mad bouncy version), Dance ManiaX 2nd Mix
STAY (Organic House version), Dance ManiaX 2nd Mix

beatmania IIDX
Comment te dire adieu, beatmania IIDX 6th style (as Orange Lounge, a cover of the Françoise Hardy song written by Serge Gainsbourg)
Marmalade Reverie, beatmania IIDX 7th style (as Orange Lounge)
LOVE IS ORANGE, beatmania IIDX 8th style (as Orange Lounge)
The end of my spiritually, beatmania IIDX 9th style (with vocalist EeL)
ASTRAL VOYAGE, beatmania IIDX 10th style (with vocalist EeL)
Les filles balancent, beatmania IIDX 11: IIDX RED (as Orange Lounge)
Tizona d'El Cid, beatmania IIDX 12: HAPPY SKY
Apocalypse ～dirge of swans～, beatmania IIDX 13: DistorteD  (as Zektbach) 
BREAK OUT, beatmania IIDX 13: DistorteD  (as Orange Lounge, a cover of the Swing Out Sister song)
INFERNO, beatmania IIDX 13: DistorteD  (as Caldeira, a collaboration with DJ YOSHITAKA)
カゴノトリ～弐式～ (Kagonotori ~Nishiki~),　beatmania IIDX 13: DistorteD  (as 橙色特別室 (Orange Lounge))
Blind Justice ~Torn souls, Hurt Faiths~, beatmania IIDX 14: GOLD (as Zektbach) 
クルクル☆ラブ~Opioid Peptide MIX~ (Curucuru Love~Opioid Peptide MIX~), beatmania IIDX 14: GOLD (as イオンチャンネル (Ion Channel))
Cookie Bouquets (L.E.D. vs TOMOSUKE fw.crimm) IIDX 15: DJ TROOPERS
Ristaccia, beatmania IIDX 15: DJ TROOPERS (as Zektbach) 
Turii -Panta rhei-, beatmania IIDX 16: EMPRESS (as Zektbach) 
Marie Antoinette(beatmania IIDX 16 EMPRESS：Marguerite du Pré)
Raison d'être〜交差する宿命〜(beatmania IIDX 17 SIRIUS：Zektbach)
Almagest (beatmania IIDX 17 SIRIUS: Galdeira, with DJ YOSHITAKA)
Todestrieb (beatmania IIDX 19 Lincle: Rche)

pop'n music
Dimanche, pop'n music 7 (as Orange Lounge)
Marigold, pop'n music 8
100sec. Kitchen Battle!! , pop'n music 8 (as Orange Lounge)
777, pop'n music 8 (with vocalist EeL)
Nick boys, pop'n music ee'MALL (with Des-ROW as Nick Boys)
明鏡止水 (Meikyou Shisui), pop'n music 10 (with Asaki)
Pinky nick, pop'n music ee'MALL 2nd avenue (with Des-ROW as Nick Boys)
空言の海 (Munagoto no umi), pop'n music ee'MALL 2nd avenue
Nick ring, pop'n music 11 (with Des-ROW as Nick Boys)
Orange AIR-LINE, pop'n music 11 (as Orange Lounge)
Space Merry Go-Round, pop'n music 12 IROHA (as Dormir)
Ferris Wheel, pop'n music 13 CARNIVAL
文明開化 (Bunmei Kaika), pop'n music 13 CARNIVAL
コキュトス (Cocytus), pop'n Music 13 CARNIVAL (with Hirofumi Sasaki)
ポップンカーニバルマーチ (pop'n CARNIVAL Theme), pop'n music 13 CARNIVAL CS
にゃんだふる55 marble version (Nyandafuru 55 marble version), pop'n music 13 CARNIVAL (as Dormir)
CODENAME: APRIL, pop'n music 14 FEVER!
DA DA DA DANCING, pop'n music 14 FEVER! (with Des-ROW)
Dollar Dollar, pop'n music 14 FEVER! (with Des-ROW as Nick Boys)
NIGHT FEVER, pop'n music 14 FEVER!
シャムシールの舞 (Shamshir no Mai), pop'n music 14 FEVER! (as Zektbach) 
魔法のたまご (Mahou on Tamago), Pop'n music 14 FEVER! CS
凛として咲く花の如く (Rinto shite saku hana no gotoku), pop'n Music 15 ADVENTURE
El pais del sol (GIVE ME MORE SALSA MIX), pop'n music 15 ADVENTURE (as Berimbau '66, remix of El pais del sol, originally by Señorita Rica)
ポップン大冒険メドレー (Pop'n Daibouken Medley), pop'n music 15 ADVENTURE
Apocalypse 〜memento mori〜, pop'n music 15 ADVENTURE (as Zektbach) 
Zeta～素数の世界と超越者～ (ZETA ~Sosuu no sekai to chouetsu sha~), pop'n music 15 ADVENTURE (as Zektbach) 
Sorrows, pop'n music 16 PARTY (with Asako Yoshihiro)
Ergosphere, pop'n music 16 PARTY 
みずうみの記憶 (Mizuumi no kioku), pop'n music 16 PARTY (as Dormir)
シュレーディガーの猫　(Shurēdingā no neko), pop'n music 16 PARTY (as Cait Sith)
誰がために陽はのぼる (Daregatameni yō wa noboru), pop'n music 17 THE MOVIE (with the vocalist MAKI)
リンゴロジック (Ringorojikku), pop'n music 17 THE MOVIE (as Dormir)
蛇神 (Kagachi), pop'n music 18 せんごく列伝 (as Zektbach)
黒髪乱れて修羅となりて (Kurokami midarete shura to narite), pop'n music 18 せんごく列伝 (as composer/arranger, song performed by Muramasa Qualia)
なまいきプリンセス (Namaiki Princess), pop'n music 19 Tune Street (as Dormir)
μ9, pop'n music portable 2 (as PAXA)
恋はどう?モロ◎波動OK☆方程式!! (Koi wa dou? Moro◎Hado OK☆Hoteishiki!!), pop'n music 20 fantasia (with Rikei Danshi)

ee'MALL
Nick Boys (as NICK BOYS)
Pinky Nick (as NICK BOYS)
空言の海 (Munagoto no umi) (with 音々 (Nene))

Guitar Freaks & DrumMania
IMPLANTATION, DrumMania 2nd Mix
MONDO STREET, DrumMania 2nd Mix (as Orange Lounge)
FuriFuri'60, DrumMania 3rd Mix (as Orange Lounge+)
GIANT SLUG, DrumMania 3rd Mix
Orange Jet Stream, Guitar Freaks 5th Mix
Sunflower Girl, Guitar Freaks 6th Mix & DrumMania 5th Mix (as SHORTCUTS)
Brazilian Anthem, Guitar Freaks 6th Mix & DrumMania 5th Mix (as Berimbau'66)
Rebirth, Guitar Freaks 7th Mix & DrumMania 6th Mix
jet coaster☆girl, Guitar Freaks 7th Mix & DrumMania 6th Mix (with Three Berry Icecream)
pot-pourri d'orange, Guitar Freaks 7th Mix & DrumMania 6th Mix (as Orange Lounge)
CHOCOLATE PHILOSOPHY, Guitar Freaks 8th Mix & DrumMania 7th Mix (with Yuu Tokiwa)
INFINITE, Guitar Freaks 8th Mix & DrumMania 7th Mix (as PARALLEL FLOATERS)
777 (GFDM ver.), Guitar Freaks 9th Mix & DrumMania 8th Mix (with vocalist EeL)
Twinkle Star, Guitar Freaks 9th Mix & DrumMania 8th Mix (with serena)
mint candy ☆ citrus drop, Guitar Freaks 10th Mix & DrumMania 9th Mix (with U.KI)
カゴノトリ (Kagonotori), Guitar Freaks 10th Mix & DrumMania 9th Mix (as 橙色特別室 (Daidaiiro Tokubetsushitsu), with Asaki and Shizue Tokui)
pot-pourri d'marmalade, Guitar Freaks 10th Mix & DrumMania 9th Mix (as Orange Lounge)
Reaching for the Stars, Guitar Freaks 11th Mix & DrumMania 10th Mix (with serena)
にゃんだふる55 (Nyandafuru 55), Guitar Freaks V & DrumMania V (as Dormir)
Flow, Guitar Freaks V & DrumMania V (as PARALLEL FLOATERS)
rebirth of love, Guitar Freaks V & DrumMania V (as Ark of the Covenant)
Die Zauberflöte, Guitar Freaks V & DrumMania V (as わんにゃん☆パニックス, with Asaki and Hideyuki Ono)
αρχη, Guitar Freaks V3 & DrumMania V3
walk with you, Guitar Freaks V6 & DrumMania V6: BLAZING!!!! 
cosmic agenda, Guitar Freaks XG2 & DrumMania XG2: Groove to Live (with frances maya)

Dance Dance Revolution/Dancing Stage
Electrical Parade ~Retro Future Mix~, Dancing Stage featuring Disney's Rave (with U1-ASAMi)
It's a Small World ~Ducking Hardcore Mix~, Dancing Stage featuring Disney's Rave (with U1-ASAMi)
Vem brincar, Dance Dance Revolution SuperNOVA 2 (under Caldeira, with DJ YOSHITAKA)
Dreamin', Dance Dance Revolution HOTTEST PARTY 2 (with Adreana)
Shine, Dance Dance Revolution X2 (with Adreana)
Seasons, Dance Dance Revolution (2010 Wii release), Dance Dance Revolution X3 VS 2ndMIX(with Crystal Paloa)
Diamond Night, Dance Dance Revolution II (with Alexa Slaymaker)
Resurrection, Dance Dance Revolution X3 VS 2ndMIX (under Dormir, with crimm)

Jubeat
Macuilxochitl, Jubeat Ripples 
さようならトリップ (Sayonara Trip), Jubeat Knit (under Dormir, with crimm)
量子の海のリントヴルム (Ryoshi no Umi no Lindworm), Jubeat Copious (under 黒猫ダンジョン)

Reflec Beat
L'erisia (Primal Logic), Reflec Beat (under Zektbach)
Wenkamui, Reflec Beat (under Zektbach)
Une mage blanche (under Dormir, with crimm)

Discography
marble
The Epic of Zektbach -Ristaccia-
The Epic of Zektbach -FRAGMENTS OF ARIA TE'LARIA-
The Epic of Zektbach -Masinowa-
Petit March (with Dormir)

References 

Year of birth missing (living people)
Japanese male musicians
Japanese musicians
Living people
Musicians from Kanagawa Prefecture
People from Kanagawa Prefecture